Waking Dream is a young adult novel by Rhiannon Lassiter, first published in 2002. It is a dark fantasy about magic, dreams and another world.

Plot summary
While attending the reading of her father's will with her mother and stepfather, Bethany meets her cousin Poppy, a spoiled girl who is believed to have magic powers. Bethany is left a mysterious painting in the will; it does not look like a piece he would normally paint. Bethany is unwillingly sent to stay at Poppy's house for the summer. A strange boy called Rivalaun turns up, claiming to be Bethany and Poppy's cousin.

Later on in the book, Poppy gets fed up with all the lies and secrets, so she steals Bethany's painting from her room and paints it on her wall. Poppy uses some kind of magic so that she can walk through into the world of the painting: a world of dreams. Rivalaun and Bethany follow to rescue her. They then cannot get back to the normal world unless they complete a quest.

Characters 

Bethany- the protagonist
Poppy- Bethany's cousin
Rivalaun- Bethany and Poppy's cousin 
Ceily- Bethany's mother
David- Bethany's stepfather
Emily- Poppy's mother
Sylver- Poppy's father
Daanan- Rivalaun's father

References

External links

2002 British novels
Young adult fantasy novels
British young adult novels
British fantasy novels
2002 fantasy novels
Pan Books books